Percolomonas is a genus of free-living flagellate Heteroloboseans, forming a clade with Stephanopogon.

The genus includes six described species (see infobox). However, P. cosmopolitus is likely a species complex containing multiple cryptic species of extremely similar morphology but significant genetic divergence.

References 

Percolozoa
Excavata genera